David da Rocha Genuino (born 17 November 1980) is a Brazilian footballer that currently plays for Udinese Calcio in the Serie A.

Honours

Clubs
Persipura Jayapura :
Liga Indonesia Premier Division champions : 1 (2005)
Indonesia Super League champions : 1 (2008-09)

References

External links

1980 births
Association football midfielders
Brazilian expatriate footballers
Brazilian expatriate sportspeople in Indonesia
Brazilian footballers
Expatriate footballers in Indonesia
Liga 1 (Indonesia) players
Living people
Indonesian Super League-winning players
PSM Makassar players
Persija Jakarta (IPL) players
Persipura Jayapura players